IMBeR (Integrated Marine Biosphere Research) is a Future Earth-SCOR sponsored international project that promotes integrated marine research through a range of research topics towards sustainable, productive and healthy oceans at a time of global change, for the benefit of society.

Overview 
IMBeR research seeks to identify the natural mechanisms by which marine life influences marine biogeochemical cycles, and how these, in turn, influence marine ecosystems and how anthropogenic activities are impacted and impacts on the oceans. In 2008, it engaged in the GLOBEC-IMBER Transition Task Team (TTT), and upon TTT's recommendations, IMBER entered into its second phase at the end of 2009, aiming at to cover marine ecosystem research with associated latest technical and academic development. The GLOBEC research programme was to be finished by end 2008. Both GLOBEC and IMBER board members held meetings in the UK and the USA to confer the plan.

Central to the IMBeR goal is the development of a predictive understanding of how marine biogeochemical cycles and ecosystems respond to complex forcing, such as large-scale climatic variations, changing physical dynamics, carbon cycle chemistry and nutrient fluxes, and the impacts of marine harvesting. Changes in marine biogeochemical cycles and ecosystems due to global change will also have consequences for the broader Earth System. An even greater challenge will be drawing together the natural and social science communities to study some of the key impacts and feedbacks between the marine and human systems.

IMBeR International Project Office 
The IMBeR International Project Office (IPO) coordinates and organizes international activities of the project, provides a structure for data management for IMBeR projects, ensures financial management of the project, and promotes IMBeR in the wider scientific community.

Other offices 
East China Normal University (ECNU) in Shanghai holds the regional office for IMBeR at their "State Key Laboratory of Estuarine and Coastal Research."

The Ocean Frontier Institute, based at Dalhousie University in Halifax administers the Canadian project office of the Integrated Marine Biosphere Research (IMBeR) program.

Publications

The first IMBER Science Plan and Implementation Strategy (SPIS) was published in 2005. The latest publication of "IMBeR SPIS 2017" has been released in 2017.

See also 

 Institute of Marine Research, Bergen
 International Geosphere-Biosphere Programme
 International Science Council 
 East China Normal University
 Future Earth
 National Centre for Polar and Ocean Research
 National Institute of Polar Research (Japan)
 National Marine Biological Library, Plymouth. 
 The Research Council of Norway
 University of Cape Town
 Woods Hole Oceanographic Institution

References

Further reading

External links 
SCOR Webpage　a.k.a. Special Committee on Oceanic Research, an NGO
Future Earth Webpage
State Key Laboratory of Estuarine and Coastal Research, East China Normal University
The Research Council of Norway

Oceanography
Human impact on the environment
Research projects